Reuben Gridley Wright Farm Complex is a historic home and farm complex located at Westfield in Chautauqua County, New York. The home is a two-story wood frame Queen Anne style dwelling built in 1883 for Rueben Gridley Wright, one of Westfield's most prominent citizens. The house was designed by Fredonia architect Enoch A. Curtis. The property includes five contributing farm outbuildings that relate to its operation as a, extensive late 19th century vineyard operation.

It was listed on the National Register of Historic Places in 1983.

References

Houses on the National Register of Historic Places in New York (state)
Queen Anne architecture in New York (state)
Houses completed in 1883
Houses in Chautauqua County, New York
U.S. Route 20
National Register of Historic Places in Chautauqua County, New York